Baskaran Pillai, also known as Dattatreya Siva Baba or Siva Baba, is an authentic representative of the Tamil Siddha tradition and one of the first of its lineage to promote knowledge of the Tamil Siddhas in the West. Wayne Dyer endorsed and popularized Dr. Pillai's manifestation teachings through his book Manifest your Destiny, which he dedicated to Pillai and also wrote a chapter in his final book I can See Clearly Now.  The Tamil Siddhar are spiritual technologists who practiced metaphysical arts and sciences.  Time magazine called Pillai "The YouTube Guru". He has initiated philanthropic projects across India, Mexico and the U.S., which include the Million Meals Project and educating underprivileged children. His educational programs in public schools and tuition centers focuses on developing academic and social skills of disadvantaged students in India, Mexico and the United States through brain-enhancement sounds. These programs are implemented through the Tripura Foundation, established by Pillai in 1991, a consulting non-governmental organization to the United Nations Economic and Social Council (ECOSOC).

Early life
Baskaran Pillai was born on 1 February 1949, in Rameswaram, Tamil Nadu, an island in Southern India that lies between India and Sri Lanka. His father was Subramania Pillai, a painter and photographer who ran a small business for pilgrims who visited Rameswaram, which happens to be one of the most important holy places for all Hindus. His mother Nambu Lakshmi was a housewife and the daughter of the Village head of Rameswaram. Pillai grew up with four siblings, all boys, in an island without electricity, automobiles or any other modern amenities.  As a child, Pillai's mother, concerned with Pillai's spiritual attractions and sleeplessness, consulted physicians who found no medical issues. His family dissuaded him from pursuing spiritual interests and instead encouraged academics and mundane pursuits.

Education
Pillai went to the government school in Rameswaram and later on to a government college in Ramanathapuram. In 1971 and 1977, he received his Bachelors and master's degree respectively in English literature from the University of Madurai.  Pillai's interest in spirituality led him to become a TM teacher under the guidance of Maharishi Mahesh Yogi during which time he spent a few years in and out of Rishikesh, Himalayas. Maharishi Mahesh Yogi appointed Pillai as the head of his organization in the state of Tamil Nadu, a post which Pillai ultimately renounced.

During 1979-81 Pillai was awarded the University's Scholarship to do research on Comparative Literature. He received a second degree, a Master of Letters in 1982, writing a thesis comparing John Donne's poetry to that of Kalladanar, a Tamil poet of the 10th Century. Pillai recollects that the period of living with University wizards, planted the seeds of unquenchable thirst for knowledge and spirit of investigation which deeply impacted his personal teachings.

In 1983, he left for the US to pursue his PhD at the University of Pittsburgh. His graduate work involved phenomenology of religion with a dissertation on Manikkavacakar, a South Indian mystic. Pillai served as both faculty and teacher of the University of Pittsburgh's Informal Programs from 1985–1989.  After receiving his PhD in 1989, Dr. Pillai served as the Coordinator of Indian Studies under the Asian Studies program. He then moved on to the Indian Heritage Research Foundation and became the subject editor for the Encyclopedia of Hinduism.

Marriage

In 1976, Pillai married Vasantha. Being a householder, his spirituality met with challenges of running a family life.  He has one daughter.

Teaching
Although Pillai moved out of the TM movement, he continued spiritual pursuits.  From 1984–1988, Pillai taught at the Pitt Informal Program (PIP) a variety of Buddhist, Tantric and Yogic meditation courses.  While working on his Doctoral dissertation, Pillai lectured on Hinduism and Buddhism in and around the Pittsburgh area besides teaching undergraduate students a course on a Survey of World Religions.   Pillai made a decision to leave the academia and to teach spirituality and accordingly from 1989 onward he has traveled extensively teaching spirituality and meditation.

In 1990 Pillai moved briefly to Los Angeles, California and began to teach meditation seminars. By the same time, he also established Tripura Foundation, a charitable educational organization to educate people on the value of spirituality in human life and culture. Tripura Foundation has charitable projects in USA, India and Mexico.

During this 10-year time (1990–2000) Pillai went through many personal transformations, changing his spiritual name many times. He was known as Sri Guruji, Brzee, Sri Siva, Siva Baba, Dattatreya Siva Baba and so on. Dr. Pillai jokingly calls his names as impersonations that he assumed based on divine palm leaves astrological readings that revealed his previous incarnations as Shirdi Baba, Dattatreya, Swami Ramalingam and others. Dr.Pillai was also independently listed in Walter Semkiw MD's book Born Again: Reincarnation Cases Involving International Celebrities, India’s Political Legends and Film Stars with these prior incarnations.

It was during this time that he gave Wayne Dyer the ‘ Ah' meditation, which became popular through Dyer’s book Manifest Your Destiny.  Dyer dedicated the book to Dr. Pillai who at the time was called Sri Guruji. Dr. Dyer paid tribute to Dr. Pillai in one of his last books I can See Clearly Now, by writing of Dr. Pillai: "Thank you! Thank you! Thank you, Guruji, for being willing to bring this phenomenal teaching to me..."

Publications and media
Pillai appeared briefly in the 1997 Italian movie Nirvana as the guru to Christopher Lambert's character.  During five years (2000–2005), Dr. Pillai self-published two books Life Changing Sounds: Tools from the Other Side and The One Minute Guide to Prosperity and Enlightenment. These books are out of print now. Pillai produced many hundreds of video clips for YouTube for which Time magazine dubbed him as the YouTube Guru.

Science and religion
In 2005, Pillai renamed his organization as Pillai Center for Mind Science and widened his vision to incorporate more scientific exploration of the spiritual principles.  Einstein's saying that religion without science is blind and science without religion is lame, was cited frequently by Pillai and he changed his organizations and teachings to reflect that ideology.

Phonemic Intelligence is one of the first scientifically validated initiatives.  Phonemic Intelligence is based on the theory that sounds (phonemes) can change one's intelligence. The first scientific research on phonemic intelligence was carried out by SRM University Medical School, Chennai, India in 2006.  Medical students participated in the study and the results were published in a journal.  In 2011, Brain Science International in San Francisco conducted QEEG research on Phonemic Intelligence and found that Phonemic Intelligence can activate the anterior cingulate, a part of the brain associated with intelligence and compassion. Currently Phonemic Intelligence is being researched at World Care Clinical and Harvard Researchers at Massachusetts General Hospital. The pilot is expected to be completed by July 2016.

Research institute
Dr. Pillai started the East West Integrative Medicine Center in 2013 which is an educational research institute for Ayurvedic and Siddha Herbs, and acquired Vopec Pharmaceuticals in Chennai, India to further his interest in traditional Indian medicine.  In 2016 Vopec and East West collaborated on many research projects which eventually led to the formulation of an allopathic wing within Vopec. With assistance from Agastiya Biotech, USA, Vopec became a contract development and manufacturing organization for drug research and initiated clinical trials for cancer medicine.

Drug discovery
In 2019 Pillai discovered several small molecules for cancer therapy.  The US FDA awarded Orphan Drug Designation in 2022 for the first of these molecules for the treatment of several rare cancers. In 2023 the cancer molecule entered Phase I clinical study in India.

Humanitarian work
Tripura Foundation has carried out a number of charitable activities in India, the US and Mexico, its current goal is to teach Phonemic Intelligences to under-privileged children. In India, at about 101 Tripura Hope Centers, children are actively practicing Phonemic Intelligence.  In the US, public schools in New York, Detroit and California have picked up instruction.

World forums
 Dr. Pillai has been an invited speaker in over 40 countries around the world spreading the message of the need of unifying science and religion to enhance personal transformation and promote world peace.
 In 1998, Dr. Pillai was an invited speaker at the United Nations' World Religions Forum representing Hinduism in Buenos Aires, Argentina.
 In 2008, Pillai was an invited Speaker at the World Knowledge Forum in Seoul, South Korea.

References

External links 
 • AstroVed's Official website

1949 births
Living people
American spiritual teachers
20th-century Hindu religious leaders
21st-century Hindu religious leaders
Ascetics
New Age spiritual leaders
Transcendental Meditation
University of Pittsburgh alumni
Indian Hindu spiritual teachers
Indian yoga teachers